Tyson is both a surname and a masculine given name.

Tyson may also refer to:

Films
Tyson (1995 film), an HBO television movie about heavyweight boxer Mike Tyson
Tyson (2008 film), a 2008 documentary about Mike Tyson
Tyson (2016 film), a 2016 Kannada film
Tyson (2023 film), an upcoming Malayalam film

Places
Tysons Corner, Virginia, a census-designated place also known as Tysons
Tyson Research Center, a biological field station in Missouri
Tyson Wash, Arizona
Tyson Event Center/ Gateway Arena, Sioux City, Iowa
13123 Tyson, an asteroid
Tyson, Ontario, Canada

Other uses
Tyson Foods, multinational agribusiness corporation
Tyson (dog), skateboarding bulldog
Tyson (fish), a genus of perciform fishes
Tyson turbine, a hydropower system
Tyson Medal, an astronomy prize at the University of Cambridge
T.Y.S.O.N., a poem published in 1898